Chemokine-like factor (CKLF) is a member of the CKLF-like MARVEL transmembrane domain-containing family of proteins that in humans is encoded by the CKLF gene. This gene is located on band 22.1 in the long (i.e. "q") arm of chromosome 16.

Isoforms 
Through the process of alternative splicing, the CKLF gene encodes 4 CKLF protein isoforms, i.e. proteins made from different areas of the same gene. These isoforms are 1) CKLF1 and CKLF3 proteins that consist  of 99 and 67 amino acids, respectively, and are secreted from their parent cells and 2) CKLF2 (which is the full-length product of the CKLF gene) and CKLF4 proteins which consist of 152 and 120 amino acids, respectively, and are located in the membranes of their parent cells.

CKLF1 
CKLF1 is the first member of the CKLF-like MARVEL transmembrane domain-containing family of proteins to be defined and the most investigated of its four  isoforms. Studies conducted in freshly isolated cells, cultured cells, animals, and tissue samples indicate that CKLF1 is a chemokine-like chemotactic factor that acts through the CCR4 receptors on human CD4+ Th2 lymphocytes, neutrophils, monocytes, macrophages, dendritic cells, and perhaps other CCR4-receptor bearing cells. Preliminary findings suggest that the actions of CKLF1 on these CCR4-bearing cells may contribute to the maturation of various tissues such as blood cells and skeletal muscle from their precursor cells and the regulation of allergic (e.g. asthma), autoimmune (e.g. rheumatoid arthritis and the antiphospholipid syndrome), and inflammatory (e.g. acute respiratory distress syndrome) disorders. Other studies have found that: 1) the benign fibrous skin tumor, keloids, had higher levels of CKLF1 and CKLF1 mRNA than nearby normal skin tissues; 2) CKLF1 levels were higher in ovarian carcinoma tissues than nearby normal ovary tissues and patients with higher levels of CKLF1 in their ovarian cancer tissues had a more aggressive cancer than patients with lover levels of the protein in their ovarian cancer tissues; and 3) the levels of CKLF1 protein were higher in cancerous than nearby normal liver tissues in patients with hepatocellular carcinoma (HCC) and patients with higher HCC tissue levels of CKLF1 had poorer overall survival times than patients with lower levels of this protein in their HCC tissues. These results suggest that high levels of CKLF1 promote the development and/or progression of these three neoplasms although further studies are required to further define these relationships and to determine if CKLF1 can be used as a marker for their severity and/or a therapeutic target for treating them.

CKLF2–4 
Relative little is known about the normal functions and pathological actions of the CKLF2, CKLF3, and CKLF4 isoforms.

References

Further reading

External links 
 

Human proteins
Gene expression